Gimnazija Meša Selimović is a high school in Tuzla, Bosnia and Herzegovina. It was founded on 12 September 1899.

Notable students
 Mirza Delibašić
 Meša Selimović
 Mirza Teletović
 Vedad Ibišević
 Elmedin Kikanović
 Mladen Stojanović
 Sreten Stojanović

References

External links
 

Gymnasiums in Bosnia and Herzegovina

Education in Tuzla
Buildings and structures in Tuzla